The Voice of Jingjinji (literally The Voice of Beijing, Tianjin & Hebei) is the radio station of Radio Beijing Corporation, broadcasting stories about Jing-Jin-Ji on FM100.6. It is previously known as Beijing Metro Radio.

External links
 Official Website (Chinese)

Mandarin-language radio stations
Radio stations in China
Mass media in Beijing